Güstrow is a former district in Mecklenburg-Vorpommern, Germany. It was bounded by (from the north and clockwise) the districts of Bad Doberan, Nordvorpommern, Demmin, Müritz, Parchim and Nordwestmecklenburg. The district was disbanded at the district reform of September 2011. Its territory has been part of the district of Rostock since.

History
From 1621 to 1695 the present-day district was occupied by the small duchy of Mecklenburg-Güstrow. Afterwards large parts belonged to the duchy of Mecklenburg-Schwerin, a small portion to the duchy of Mecklenburg-Strelitz (see Mecklenburg).

Güstrow District was established in 1994 by merging the former districts of Güstrow, Teterow and Bützow. This district was merged with the district of Bad Doberan at the district reform of 4 September 2011, forming the new district of Rostock.

Geography
The district was situated in the centre of Mecklenburg-Vorpommern. The Warnow river runs through the district from the southwest to the north. In the southern part of the district there are several lakes constituting the northern edge of the Müritz lakeland.

Coat of arms

Towns and municipalities
The subdivisions of the district were (situation August 2011):

References

External links

Official website  (German)

Former districts of Mecklenburg-Western Pomerania
Rostock (district)